In Love with Detail is the debut album by Delorentos released on 21 April 2007. It reached #7 in the Irish Singles Chart and was subsequently nominated for the Choice Music Prize for Irish Album of the Year 2007.

Album information 
Composed in between relentless touring in 2006, the album blends heavy rock ("Waiting" + "Until the next time"), alternative rock ("Basis of Everything", "Any Other Way") with more mainstream pop-indie ("Do You Realise", "Stop"). Written, played, and co-produced (with Engineer Gareth Mannix) by Níal, Ross, Ronan and Kier, the self-funded record was released on their own DeloRecords, and distributed by their managers label, Cottage Records. The album was recorded with Gareth Mannix in four week-long sessions between November 2006 and February 2007. Mannix had previously worked with Republic of Loose, The Chalets and The Blizzards.

To support the release, the track "Eustace Street" was released as a download on the same day. The next physical release was the single "Stop" in July 2007. It contained the tracks "Stop" (a remixed single version), "She's So Modern" and a remix of "Stop" by Irish V2 artist Jape called "Stop – What a Comedown".

Further details 
Delorentos recorded their debut album in Dublin's Sun and Apollo Studios with Gareth Mannix. In Love with Detail was released on their own Cottage Records label on 20 April 2007. The album entered the Irish Albums Chart at #7, spending five weeks in that chart, and later received a nomination for the Choice Music Prize. The majority of the album was written over the previous year.
The iTunes Version of the album comes with bonus track Neon, later included on the Do You Realise Ep.

Track listing

Sales and chart performance 
By 20 July, exactly three months after its release, the album had sold 5,000 copies and reached #7 in the Irish Albums Chart. It reached Gold status (7,500) by the Start of December, with the band announcing this at their sold out Ambassador show. It has since passed the 10,000 mark.

References

External links 
 Official site
 Chart details

Delorentos albums
2007 albums